Leeann is a given name. Notable people with the surname include: 

 Leeann Chin (restaurateur) (1933-2010), Chinese-born American restaurateur
 Leeann Dempster, chief executive of Hibernian F.C.
 Leeann Tweeden (born 1973), American radio broadcaster, model and sports commentator